The Nine Herbs Charm, Nigon Wyrta Galdor, Lay of the Nine Healing Herbs, or Nine Wort Spell (among other names) is an Old English charm recorded in the tenth-century CE Anglo-Saxon medical compilation known as Lacnunga, which survives on the manuscript, Harley MS 585, in the British Library, in London. The charm involves the preparation of nine plants.

The poem contains one of two clear Old English mentions of the god Woden in Old English poetry; the other is Maxims I of the Exeter Book. Robert K. Gordon's translation of the section reads as follows:

The numbers nine and three, significant in Germanic paganism and later Germanic folklore, are mentioned frequently throughout the charm.

Scholars have proposed that this passage describes Woden coming to the assistance of the herbs through his use of nine twigs, each twig inscribed with the runic first-letter initial of a plant.

According to Gordon, the poem is "clearly an old heathen thing which has been subjected to Christian censorship." Malcolm Laurence Cameron states that chanting the poem aloud results in a "marvellously incantatory effect".

See also
Galdr
Hávamál
Mímir
Merseburg Incantations

Notes

References

Cameron, Malcolm Laurence (1993). Anglo-Saxon Medicine. Cambridge University Press. 
Gordon, R. K. (1962). Anglo-Saxon Poetry. Everyman's Library #794. M. Dent & Sons, LTD.
Macleod, Mindy; Mees, Bernard (2006). Runic Amulets and Magic Objects. Boydell Press. 
Mayr-Harting, Henry (1991). The Coming of Christianity to Anglo-Saxon England. Penn State Press

External links

 Foys, Martin et al. Old English Poetry in Facsimile Project (Center for the History of Print and Digital Culture, University of Wisconsin-Madison, 2019-); digital facsimile edition and Modern English translation. Accessed February 2023.
 Hopkins, Joseph S. 2020. "Nigon Wyrta Galdor: Popularly Known as the Nine Herbs Charm". Mimisbrunnr.info. Accessed February 2023.
 Hostetter, Aaron K. 2023. "The Metrical Charms". Old English Poetry Project. Rutgers University-Camden. Accessed February 2023.
 Jolly, Karen Louise. 1996. "Lay of the Nine Herbs and Lay of the Nine Twigs of Woden". Popular Religion in Late Saxon England: Elf Charms in Context (Chapel Hill: University of North Carolina Press, 1996), pp. 125-127.
 Thomas, Val. 2022. "The Nine Herbs Charm: Plants Poisons and Poetry". Herbal History Research Network. Accessed February 2023.

Anglo-Saxon metrical charms
Biologically-based therapies
Herbalism
Old English medicine
Pharmacognosy